The Tenant of Wildfell Hall is the first adaptation of Anne Brontë's 1848 novel of the same name, produced by BBC and directed by Peter Sasdy. The serial stars Janet Munro as Helen Graham, Bryan Marshall as Gilbert Markham and Corin Redgrave as her spoiled and drunkard husband Arthur Huntington. The serial is incomplete, as episode one, "Recluse", is missing from the BBC Archive.

Plot summary
A mysterious young woman arrives with her young son at Wildfell Hall, a nearby old mansion. She is determined to lead an independent existence, but her new neighbors won't leave her alone. They want to reveal her secrets and soon she finds herself the victim of local slander. Only young farmer, Gilbert Markham, is compassionate toward her.

For a full-length summary see: The Tenant of Wildfell Hall plot summary.

Episodes

Cast

]]

Janet Munro – Helen Graham
Corin Redgrave – Arthur Huntingdon
Bryan Marshall – Gilbert Markham
Jeremy Burring – Arthur Huntingdon the Younger
William Gaunt – Frederick Lawrence
Margery Withers – Rachel
Charles Lamb – Benson
Megs Jenkins – Mrs. Markham
Anthony May – Fergus Markham
Felicity Kendal – Rose Markham
Suzan Farmer – Eliza Millward
Jean Anderson – Peggy Maxwell
John Quentin – Lord Lowborough
Angela Browne – Lady Annabella Lowborough
Donald Burton – Ralph Hattersley
Nicola Davies – Esther Hargrave
Janet Key – Millicent Hargrave
Jonathan Newth – Walter Hargrave
Valerie Van Ost – Miss Myers

References

External links

1968 British television series debuts
1969 British television series endings
1960s British drama television series
1960s British television miniseries
BBC television dramas
Lost BBC episodes
Television series set in the 1820s
English-language television shows
Television shows based on British novels
The Tenant of Wildfell Hall
Films directed by Peter Sasdy